Matachewan First Nation is an Ojibway and Cree First Nation reserve located in the Timiskaming District of Ontario, Canada. As of March, 2012, they had a total registered population of 642 people, of which 40 people lived on their own reserves.

Governance
The Nation is governed by the Act Electoral System, in with a Chief and five Councillors are elected for a two-year term. The current council consists of Chief Alex Batisse, and Councillors Robert Batisse, Leonil Boucher, Gail Brubacher, Elenor Hendrix and Jean Lemieux. Their term of office expires on March 23, 2013.

As a signatory to Treaty 9, the First Nation is member of Wabun Tribal Council, a non-political Regional Chiefs Council and Nishnawbe Aski Nation, a Tribal Political Organisation representing most all of the First Nations in northern Ontario.

Reserves
Matachewan First Nation have reserved for themselves one reserve:
  Matachewan 72

External links
Nation's Website
AANDC Profile

References

Swampy Cree
Ojibwe governments
First Nations governments in Ontario
Communities in Timiskaming District
Cree governments
Algonquian ethnonyms
Ojibwe reserves in Ontario
Cree reserves in Ontario